Youssouf Diallo may refer to:

 Youssouf Diallo (Guinean footballer) (b. 1984), Guinean footballer
 Youssouf Diallo (athlete), Malian athlete